Tenaya Peak is a mountain in the Yosemite high country, rising above Tenaya Lake. Tenaya Peak is named after Chief Tenaya, who met the Mariposa Battalion near the shores of the Tenaya lake. In 1851, the Mariposa Battalion under Captain John Boling expelled Chief Tenaya and his people from what was to become Yosemite National Park.

Recreation
Tenaya Peak is a popular rock climbing destination, with multiple climbing ascents. There is also some class 2 and class 3 hikes to the summit.

References

External links
 

Mountains of Yosemite National Park
Mountains of Mariposa County, California
Mountains of Northern California